The Men's 50 metre rifle prone Team event at the 2013 Southeast Asian Games took place on 11 December 2013 at the North Dagon Shooting Range in Yangon, Myanmar.

There were eight teams of three shooters competed, the results of the team competition also served as qualification for individual competition, the top eight shooters qualified to individual final

Each shooter fired 60 shots with a .22 Long Rifle at 50 metres distance from the prone position. Scores for each shot were in increments of .1, with a maximum score of 10.9, all scores from three shooters per team combine to determine team scores.

Schedule
All times are Myanmar Standard Time (UTC+06:30)

Results

References

Shooting at the 2013 Southeast Asian Games